Svetlana Alexandrovna Alexievich (born 31 May 1948) is a Belarusian investigative journalist, essayist and oral historian who writes in Russian. She was awarded the 2015 Nobel Prize in Literature "for her polyphonic writings, a monument to suffering and courage in our time". She is the first writer from Belarus to receive the award.

Background 
Born in the west Ukrainian town of Stanislav (Ivano-Frankivsk since 1962) to a Belarusian father and a Ukrainian mother, Svetlana Alexievich grew up in Belarus. After graduating from high school she worked as a reporter in several local newspapers. In 1972 she graduated from Belarusian State University and became a correspondent for the literary magazine Nyoman in Minsk (1976). 

In a 2015 interview, she mentioned early influences: "I explored the world through people like Hanna Krall and Ryszard Kapuściński." During her career in journalism, Alexievich specialized in crafting narratives based on witness testimonies. In the process, she wrote artfully constructed oral histories of several dramatic events in Soviet history: the Second World War,  Afghan War, dissolution of the Soviet Union, and the Chernobyl disaster.

In 1989 Alexievich's book Zinky Boys, about the fallen soldiers who had returned in zinc coffins from the Soviet-Afghan War of 1979 – 1985, was the subject of controversy, and she was accused of "defamation" and "desecration of the soldiers' honor". Alexievich was tried a number of times between 1992 and 1996. After political persecution by the Lukashenko administration, she left Belarus in 2000. The International Cities of Refuge Network offered her sanctuary, and during the following decade she lived in Paris, Gothenburg and Berlin. In 2011, Alexievich moved back to Minsk.

Influences and legacy 
Alexievich's books trace the emotional history of the Soviet and post-Soviet individual through carefully constructed collages of interviews. According to Russian writer and critic Dmitry Bykov, her books owe much to the ideas of Belarusian writer Ales Adamovich, who felt that the best way to describe the horrors of the 20th century was not by creating fiction but through recording the testimonies of witnesses. Belarusian poet Uladzimir Nyaklyayew called Adamovich "her literary godfather". He also named the documentary novel I'm From Fire Village by Ales Adamovich, Janka Bryl and Uladzimir Kalesnik, about the villages burned by the German troops during the occupation of Belarus, as the main single book that has influenced Alexievich's attitude to literature. Alexievich has confirmed the influence of Adamovich and Belarusian writer Vasil Bykaŭ, among others. She regards Varlam Shalamov as the best writer of the 20th century.

Her most notable works in English translation include a collection of first-hand accounts from the war in Afghanistan (Zinky Boys: Soviet Voices from a Forgotten War) and an oral history of the Chernobyl disaster (Chernobyl Prayer / Voices from Chernobyl). Alexievich describes the theme of her works this way:

Works 
Her first book, War's Unwomanly Face, came out in 1985. It was repeatedly reprinted and sold more than two million copies. The book was finished in 1983 and published (in short edition) in Oktyabr, a Soviet monthly literary magazine, in February 1984. In 1985, the book was published by several publishers, and the number of printed copies reached 2,000,000 in the next five years. This novel is made up of monologues of women in the war speaking about the aspects of World War II that had never been related before. Another book, The Last Witnesses: the Book of Unchildlike Stories, describes personal memories of children during wartime. The war seen through women's and children's eyes revealed a new world of feelings.

In 1992, Alexievich published "Boys in Zinc". The course of the Soviet-Afghan War (1979-1989) is told through emotive personal testimony from unnamed participants of the war; from nurses to commissioned officers and pilots, mothers and widows. Each provides an excerpt of the Soviet-Afghan War which was disguised in the face of criticism first as political support, then intervention, and finally humanitarian aid to the Afghan people. Alexievich writes at the beginning of the book: 

Alexievich was not embedded with the Red Army due to her reputation in the Soviet Union; instead, she travelled to Kabul on her own prerogative during the war and gathered many accounts from veterans returning from Afghanistan. In "Boys in Zinc", Alexievich calls herself 'a historian of the untraceable' and 'strive[s] desperately (from book to book) to do one thing - reduce history to the human being.' She brings brutally honest accounts of the war to lay at the feet of the Soviet people but claims no heroism for herself: 'I went [to watch them assemble pieces of boys blown up by an anti-tank mine] and there was nothing heroic about it because I fainted there. Perhaps it was from the heat, perhaps from the shock. I want to be honest.' The monologues which make up the book are honest (if edited for clarity) reproductions of the oral histories Alexievich collected, including those who perhaps did not understand her purpose: 'What's your book for? Who's it for? None of us who came back from there will like it anyway. How can you possibly tell people how it was? The dead camels and dead men lying in a single pool of blood, with their blood mingled together. Who wants that?' Alexievich was brought to trial in Minsk between 1992 and 1996, accused of distorting and falsifying the testimony of Afghan veterans and their mothers who were 'offended [...] that their boys were portrayed exclusively as soulless killer-robots, pillagers, drug addicts and rapists...'  The trial, while apparently defending the honour of the army and veterans, is widely seen as an attempt to preserve old ideology in post-communist Belarus. The Belarus League for Human Rights claims that in the early 1990s, multiple cases were directed against democratically inclined intelligentsia with politically motivated verdicts.

In 1993, she published Enchanted by Death, a book about attempted and completed suicides due to the downfall of the Soviet Union. Many people felt inseparable from the Communist ideology and unable to accept the new order surely and the newly interpreted history.

Her books were not published by Belarusian state-owned publishing houses after 1993, while private publishers in Belarus have only published two of her books: Chernobyl Prayer in 1999  and Second-hand Time in 2013, both translated into Belarusian. As a result, Alexievich has been better known in the rest of world than in Belarus.

She has been described as the first journalist to receive the Nobel Prize in Literature. She herself rejects the notion that she is a journalist, and, in fact, Alexievich's chosen genre is sometimes called "documentary literature": an artistic rendering of real events, with a degree of poetic license. In her own words:

On 26 October 2019, Alexievich was elected chairman of the Belarusian PEN Center.

Political activism

During the 2020 Belarusian protests Alexievich became a member of the Coordination Council of Sviatlana Tsikhanouskaya, the leader of the Belarusian democratic movement and main opposition candidate against President Lukashenko.

On 20 August, Alexander Konyuk, the Prosecutor-General of Belarus, initiated criminal proceedings against the members of the Coordination Council under Article 361 of the Belarusian Criminal Code, on the grounds of attempting to seize state power and harming national security.

On 26 August, Alexievich was questioned by Belarusian authorities about her involvement in the council.

On 9 September 2020, Alexievich alerted the press that "men in black masks" were trying to enter her apartment in central Minsk. "I have no friends and companions left in the Coordinating Council. All are in prison or have been forcibly sent into exile," she wrote in a statement. "First they kidnapped the country; now it's the turn of the best among us. But hundreds more will replace those who have been torn from our ranks. It is not the Coordinating Council that has rebelled. It is the country." Diplomats from Lithuania, Poland, the Czech Republic, Romania, Slovakia, and Sweden began to keep a round-the-clock watch on Alexievich's home to prevent her abduction by security services.

On 28 September 2020, Alexievich left Belarus for Germany, promising to return depending on political conditions in Belarus. Prior to her departure, she was the last member of the Coordination Council who was not in exile or under arrest.

In August 2021, her book The Last Witnesses was excluded from the school curriculum in Belarus and her name was removed from the curriculum. It was assumed that the exclusion was made for her political activity.

In her first public statement, after she was announced the Nobel Prize in 2015, Alexievich condemned Russia's annexation of Crimea in 2014. Following the 2022 Russian invasion of Ukraine, she commented that "providing a territory for an aggressor country is nothing but complicity in a crime" in relation to Belarusian involvement in the 2022 Russian invasion of Ukraine.

Awards and honours 
Alexievich has received many awards, including:
 Saint Euphrosyne of Polotsk Medal (Медаль имени Святой Евфросиньи Полоцкой)
 1984 Order of the Badge of Honour (USSR)
 1984 Nikolay Ostrovskiy literary award of the Union of Soviet Writers
 1984 Oktyabr Magazine Prize
 1985 Литературная премия имени Константина Федина of the Union of Soviet Writers
 1986 Lenin Komsomol Prize — for the book «У войны не женское лицо»
 1987 Literaturnaya Gazeta Prize
1996 Tucholsky-Preis (Swedish PEN) 
 1997 Премия имени Андрея Синявского of Novaya Gazeta — «За творческое поведение и благородство в литературе»
 1997  Prize
 1997  (Russia)
 1997 Andrei Sinyavsky Prize 
 1998 Leipzig Book Award for European Understanding
 1998 Friedrich-Ebert-Stiftung-Preis 
 1999 Herder Prize
 2005 National Book Critics Circle Award, Voices from Chernobyl
 2007 Oxfam Novib/PEN Award
 2011 Ryszard Kapuściński Award (Poland) 
 2011 Angelus Award (Poland)
 2013 Peace Prize of the German Book Trade
 2013 Prix Médicis essai, La Fin de l'homme rouge ou le temps du désenchantement (for her book Secondhand Time)
 2014 Officer of the Order of the Arts and Letters (France)
 2015 Nobel Prize in Literature
 2017 Arthur Ross Book Award Bronze Medal given by the Council on Foreign Relations for her book Secondhand Time
 2017 Golden Plate Award from the American Academy of Achievement.
 2018 Belarusian Democratic Republic 100th Jubilee Medal
 2020: Sakharov Prize for Freedom of Thought by the European Parliament (one of the named representatives of the democratic opposition in Belarus) 
 2021 Sonning Prize
2021 Order of Merit of the Federal Republic of Germany (Commander's Cross)

Alexievich is a member of the advisory committee of the Lettre Ulysses Award. She will give the inaugural Anna Politkovskaya Memorial Lecture at the British Library on 9 October 2019. The lecture is an international platform to amplify the voices of women journalists and human rights defenders working in war and conflict zones.

Publications 
 У войны не женское лицо (U voyny ne zhenskoe litso, War Does Not Have a Woman's Face), Minsk: Mastatskaya litaratura, 1985.
(English) The Unwomanly Face of War, (extracts), from Always a Woman: Stories by Soviet Women Writers, Raduga Publishers, 1987.
(English) War's Unwomanly Face, Moscow: Progress Publishers, 1988, .
(Belarusian) У вайны не жаночае аблічча. Minsk: Mast. lit., 1991. .
(Belarusian) У вайны не жаночы твар. Minsk: Mast. lit., 2019. Translated by Valiancin Akudovič. .
(Hungarian) A háború nem asszonyi dolog. Zrínyi Katonai Kiadó, 1988. .
(Finnish) Sodalla ei ole naisen kasvoja. Helsinki: Progress: SN-kirjat, 1988. Translated by Robert Kolomainen. . New edition: Keltainen kirjasto. Tammi, 2017. .
(English) The Unwomanly Face of War: An Oral History of Women in World War II, Random House, 2017, .
(German) Der Krieg hat kein weibliches Gesicht. Henschel, Berlin 1987, .
(German) New, expanded edition; übersetzt von Ganna-Maria Braungardt. Hanser Berlin, München 2013, .
(Korean) 전쟁은 여자의 얼굴을 하지 않았다 문학동네, Seoul, South Korea 2015, .
(Portuguese) A Guerra não Tem Rosto de Mulher. Elsinore, 2016. .
(Georgian) ომს არ აქვს ქალის სახე. თბილისი: ინტელექტი, 2017. .
(Turkish) Kadın Yok Savaşın Yüzünde. Kafka Yayınevi, 2016. Translated by Günay Çetao Kızılırmak. .
(Hungarian) Nők a tűzvonalban. New, expanded edition. Helikon, 2016. .
(Catalan) La guerra no té cara de dona. Raig Verd, 2018. Translated by Miquel Cabal Guarro. 
(Ukrainian) У війни не жіноче обличчя. Kharkiv: Vivat, 2016. Translated by Volodymyr Rafeyenko. 
 Последние свидетели: сто недетских колыбельных (Poslednie svideteli: sto nedetskikh kolybelnykh, The Last Witnesses: A Hundred of Unchildlike Lullabies), Moscow: Molodaya Gvardiya, 1985
(Russian) Последние свидетели: сто недетских колыбельных. Moscow, Palmira, 2004, .
(English) Last Witnesses: An Oral History of the Children of World War II. Random House, 2019 , translated by Richard Pevear and Larissa Volokhonsky.
(German) Die letzten Zeugen. Kinder im Zweiten Weltkrieg. Neues Leben, Berlin 1989; neu: Aufbau, Berlin 2005, . (Originaltitel:  Poslednyje swedeteli). Neubearbeitung und Aktualisierung 2008. Aus dem Russischen von Ganna-Maria Braungardt. Berlin: Hanser-Berlin 2014, 
(Portuguese) As Últimas Testemunhas: Cem histórias sem infância. Elsinore, 2017. .
(Hungarian) Utolsó tanúk: gyermekként a második világháborúban. Európa, 2017. .
(Turkish) Son tanıklar - Çocukluğa Aykırı Yüz Öykü. Kafka Yayınevi, 2019. Translated by Aslı Takanay. .
(Georgian) უკანასკნელი მოწმეები. თბილისი: არტანუჯი, 2018. .
(Catalan) Últims testimonis. Un solo de veus infantils. Raig Verd, 2016. Translated by Marta Rebón. 
 Цинковые мальчики (Tsinkovye malchiki, Boys in Zinc), Moscow: Molodaya Gvardiya, 1991.
(English, US) Zinky Boys: Soviet Voices from the Afghanistan War. W W Norton 1992, translated by Julia and Robin Whitby.
(English, UK) Boys in Zinc. Penguin Modern Classics 2016 , translated by Andrew Bromfield. 
(German) Zinkjungen. Afghanistan und die Folgen. Fischer, Frankfurt am Main 1992, .
(German) New, expanded edition; Hanser Berlin, München 2014, .
(Hungarian) Fiúk cinkkoporsóban. Európa, 1999. .
(Portuguese) Rapazes de Zinco: A geração soviética caída na guerra do Afeganistão. Elsinore, 2017. .
(Turkish) Çinko Çocuklar. Kafka Yayınevi, 2018. Translated by Serdar Arıkan & Fatma Arıkan. .
(Catalan) Els nois de zinc. Raig Verd, 2016. Translated by Marta Rebón. 
 Зачарованные смертью (Zacharovannye Smertyu, Enchanted by Death) (Belarusian: 1993, Russian: 1994)
(German) Im Banne des Todes. Geschichten russischer Selbstmörder. Fischer, Frankfurt am Main, 1994).
(German) Seht mal, wie ihr lebt. Russische Schicksale nach dem Umbruch. Berlin (Aufbau, Berlin 1999, .
 (Japanese) '死に魅入られた人びと : ソ連崩壊と自殺者の記錄 / Svetlana Aleksievich & Taeko Matsumoto. Shi ni miirareta hitobito : Soren hōkai to jisatsusha no kiroku'. Tóquio: Gunzōsha, 2005.
 (French) Ensorcelés par la mort." Paris: Plon, 1995. 
 Чернобыльская молитва (Chernobylskaya molitva, Chernobyl Prayer), Moscow: Ostozhye, 1997. .
(English, US) Voices from Chernobyl: The Oral History of a Nuclear Disaster. Dalkey Archive Press 2005, translated by Keith Gessen.
(English, UK) Chernobyl Prayer: A Chronicle of the Future. Penguin Modern Classics 2016, translated by Anna Gunin and Arch Tait. New translation of the revised edition published in 2013.
(German) Tschernobyl. Eine Chronik der Zukunft. Aufbau, Berlin 2006, .
(Portuguese) Vozes de Chernobyl: Histórias de um desastre nuclear., Elsinore, 2016. 
(Hungarian) Csernobili ima. Európa, 2016. 
(Turkish) Çernobil Duası - Geleceğin Tarihi. Kafka Yayınevi, 2017. Translated by Aslı Takanay. .
(Georgian) ჩერნობილის ლოცვა. თბილისი: არტანუჯი, 2015. .
(Finnish) Tšernobylista nousee rukous. Tulevaisuuden kronikka. Helsinki: Tammi, 2015. Translated by Marja-Leena Jaakkola. ISBN 978-951-31-8951-8.
(Catalan) La pregària de Txernòbil. Crònica del futur. Raig Verd, 2016. Translated by Marta Rebón. 
 Время секонд хэнд (Vremya sekond khend, Second-hand Time), Moscow: Vremia, 2013. .
(Belarusian) Час сэканд-хэнд (Канец чырвонага чалавека) / Святлана Алексіевіч. Перакл. з руск. Ц. Чарнякевіч, В. Стралко. — Мн.: Логвінаў, 2014. — 384 с. — (Бібліятэка Саюза беларускіх пісьменнікаў «Кнігарня пісьменніка»; выпуск 46). — .
(German) Secondhand-Zeit. Leben auf den Trümmern des Sozialismus. Hanser Berlin, München 2013, ; als Taschenbuch: Suhrkamp, Berlin 2015, .
(Hungarian) Elhordott múltjaink. Európa, 2015. .
(English, US) Secondhand Time: The Last of the Soviets. Random House 2016, translated by Bela Shayevich. 
(Portuguese) O Fim do Homem Soviético. Elsinore, 2017, .
(Brazilian Portuguese) O Fim do Homem Soviético. Companhia das Letras, 2016, .
(Polish) Czasy secondhand. Koniec czerwonego człowieka. Czarne 2014 , translated by Jerzy Czech
(Turkish) İkinci El Zaman - Kızıl İnsanın Sonu. Kafka Yayınevi, 2016. Translated by Sabri Gürses. .
(Georgian) სექენდ ჰენდის დრო. თბილისი: არტანუჯი, 2017. .
(Finnish) Neuvostoihmisen loppu. Kun nykyhetkestä tuli second handia. Helsinki: Tammi, 2018. Translated by Vappu Orlov. .
(Catalan) Temps de segona mà. La fi de l'home roig. Raig Verd, 2015. . New revised edition. Raig Verd, 2022. Translated by Marta Rebón. 

 References 

 External links 

Svetlana Alexievich's website  - Contains biography, bibliography and excerpts. 
 Biography at the international literature festival berlin 
  including the Nobel Lecture 7 December 2015 On the Battle Lost Interviews 
"The Guardian, A Life In..." , Interview by Luke Harding, April 2016
"A Conversation with Svetlana Alexievich", Dalkey Archive Press
Between the public and the private: Svetlana Aleksievich interviews Ales' Adamovich Canadian Slavonic Papers/ Revue Canadienne des Slavistes

 Excerpts 
Selections from Voices From Chernobyl in The Paris Review, 2015

 Articles about Svetlana Alexievich 
"The Truth in Many Voices" Timothy Snyder, NYRB, October 2015
"The Memory Keeper" Masha Gessen, The New Yorker, October 2015.
"From Russia with Love" Bookforum, August 2016.
A conspiracy of ignorance and obedience, The Telegraph'', 2015
Svetlana Alexievich: Belarusian Language Is Rural And Literary Unripe , Belarus Digest, June 2013
Belarusian Nobel laureate Sviatlana Alieksijevič hit by a smear campaign Belarus Digest, July 2017

Academic articles about Svetlana Alexievich's works
Escrita, biografia e sensibilidade: o discurso da memória soviética de Svetlana Aleksiévitch como um problema historiográfico João Camilo Portal
Mothers, father(s), daughter: Svetlana Aleksievich and The Unwomanly Face of War Angela Brintlinger
"No other proof": Svetlana Aleksievich in the tradition of Soviet war writing Daniel Bush
Mothers, prostitutes, and the collapse of the USSR: the representation of women in Svetlana Aleksievich's Zinky Boys Jeffrey W. Jones
Svetlana Aleksievich's Voices from Chernobyl: between an oral history and a death lament Anna Karpusheva
The polyphonic performance of testimony in Svetlana Aleksievich's Voices from Utopia Johanna Lindbladh
A new literary genre. Trauma and the individual perspective in Svetlana Aleksievich's Chernobyl'skaia molitva Irina Marchesini
Svetlana Aleksievich's changing narrative of the Soviet–Afghan War in Zinky Boys Holly Myers

Other 
Lukashenko's comment on Alexievich (1''12 video, in Russian, no subtitles)
Svetlana Alexievich at Goodreads
Svetlana Alexievich Quotes With Pictures  at Rugusavay.com

List of Works

1948 births
Living people
20th-century women writers
21st-century women writers
Belarusian journalists
Belarusian Nobel laureates
Belarusian people of Ukrainian descent
Belarusian women writers
Belarusian women journalists
Belarusian essayists
Nobel laureates in Literature
Oxfam Novib/PEN Award winners
Russian-language writers
Soviet journalists
Women Nobel laureates
People associated with the Chernobyl disaster
Commanders Crosses of the Order of Merit of the Federal Republic of Germany
Recipients of the Lenin Komsomol Prize
Herder Prize recipients
Prix Médicis essai winners
20th-century Belarusian writers
21st-century Belarusian writers